Ras Al Khaimah Academy, or RAKA for short, is a co- educational school located in Ras al-Khaimah, United Arab Emirates. It was founded in 1975 as the Ras Al Khaimah English Speaking School and is supported and owned by His Highness Sheikh Saud bin Saqr Al-Qassimi. The school operates under an executive principal who reports to an appointed board of governors consisting of parents, past parents, and community leaders. There are 104 nationalities represented in the student body and nearly 30 nationalities amongst the teaching and support staff. The school is accredited by EdExcel, University of Cambridge International Examinations, The Council of International Schools, British Schools in the Middle East, and the International Baccalaureate. Currently there are over 1000 students enrolled.

The school is organized into five campuses: RAK Academy International Primary School (IPK), RAK Academy British School Khuzam (BSK), RAK Academy British School Al Hamra (BSH),RAK Academy British School Al Rams (BSR) and RAK Academy International Secondary School(ISK).

Secondary Campus

In Grades 6 and 7 and 8, a modified version of the English National Curriculum of England and Wales is used. Students take the Cambridge Checkpoint Examinations (replacing the SATS) in Mathematics, English and Science at the end of Grade 8. In Grade 9 and 10, students study IGCSE courses and are entered for the final examinations at the end of Grade 10. In Grade 11 and 12, students may choose the IB Program or A Levels.

External links 
 Ras Al Khaimah Academy website
 on Google Maps

References

Cambridge schools in the United Arab Emirates
1975 establishments in the United Arab Emirates
Educational institutions established in 1975
Schools in the Emirate of Ras Al Khaimah